José Guilherme Baldocchi (born 14 March 1946), better known as Baldocchi, is a former Brazilian footballer who played as a central defender.

During his club career he played for Batatais (1964–65), Botafogo-SP (1964–67), Palmeiras (1967–72), Corinthians (1971–75) and Fortaleza (1974–77). He won a Brazilian Cup medal in 1967.

He played one international match for the Brazil national football team, on 4 March 1970 against Argentina(in the Estadio Beira-Rio). However, he was included in the Brazil squad for the 1970 FIFA World Cup.

Honours

Club
Palmeiras
 Série A: 1967 (Taça Brasil), 1967 (Torneio Roberto Gomes Pedrosa), 1969

Fortaleza
 Campeonato Cearense: 1974
 Torneio Início do Ceará: 1977

International
Brazil
 FIFA World Cup: 1970

References

1946 births
Botafogo de Futebol e Regatas players
Brazil international footballers
Brazilian footballers
1970 FIFA World Cup players
FIFA World Cup-winning players
Brazilian people of Italian descent
Living people
Sociedade Esportiva Palmeiras players
Sport Club Corinthians Paulista players
Campeonato Brasileiro Série A players
Association football defenders
People from Batatais